The escolar, Lepidocybium flavobrunneum, a species of fish in the family Gempylidae, is found in deep (200–885 metres, or 656–2,904 ft) tropical and temperate waters around the world. It is also known as snake mackerel,  (Hawaiian, sometimes written ), and is sometimes sold as "butterfish"  or "white tuna", a matter aggravated by potential health problems related to consumption of escolar, giving rise to the mocking name Ex-Lax fish.

Biology
The escolar is dark brown, growing darker with age until it is quite black. It is a fast-swimming fish with a prominent lateral keel and four to six finlets after the anal and second dorsal fins. Like its relative the oilfish (Ruvettus pretiosus), escolar cannot metabolize the wax esters (gempylotoxin) naturally found in its diet. This gives the escolar an oil content of  14–25% in its flesh.

Health effects
The escolar's wax ester content can cause keriorrhea (Greek: flow of wax), also called gempylotoxism or gempylid fish poisoning.  
Symptoms range from stomach cramps to rapid loose bowel movements, occurring 30 minutes to 36 hours following consumption. This condition may also be referred to as steatorrhea.

Reports conflict on whether deep skinning, freezing or grilling will reduce the likelihood of keriorrhea.

Mislabeling
Escolar can be mislabeled in both restaurants and at fish markets.  In 2009, tuna samples from sushi restaurants in New York City and Denver were  DNA tested. Five of nine restaurants serving fish labeled "white tuna", "white tuna (albacore)" or "super white tuna" were actually serving escolar. From 2010 to 2013, a study by Oceana, an ocean preservation organization, tested over 114 samples of tuna, and found that 84% of the white tuna samples were actually escolar.

Oceana claims that escolar has been mislabeled or otherwise confused with the following fish: Atlantic cod, oilfish (related to escolar but in a different genus), rudderfish, blue cod, black cod, king tuna, grouper, orange roughy, sea bass, gemfish, Chilean sea bass, albacore tuna, and white tuna.

Oceana claims that this mislabeling, whether by ignorance or deceit, is more hazardous than the mislabeling of other fish due to the potential health effects of escolar.

Regulation and banning
Italy and Japan have banned the sale of escolar due to its potential side effects.  It has been banned for consumption in Japan since 1977, as the Japanese government considers it toxic.  In 1999, the Swedish and Danish national food administrations informed fish trade associations and fish importing companies about the problems escolar and related fish could cause if not prepared properly and issued recommendations.

In early 2007, after a public outcry, receiving consumer complaints about mislabeled fish and conducting an investigation, the Hong Kong government's Centre for Food Safety recommended escolar not be used for catering purposes, advised clear labeling and identification of fish species before sale, and purchase of fish from reliable sources, and recommended consumers become aware of the possible health effects of consumption of escolar, oilfish, and related species.  The Hong Kong government has established a working group composed of members of the academia, trade and consumer group to prepare guidelines for assisting the trade and consumers in identifying relevant species of fish.

In the United States, the FDA, after receiving complaints about diarrhea associated with escolar consumption, issued a bulletin recommending against import of the fish in the early 1990s.  However, the FDA backed away from this recommendation and withdrew the bulletin several years later after deciding the fish was nontoxic and nonlethal.  Currently, the FDA informally recommends, "Escolar should not be marketed in interstate commerce."

In mid-2007, the Canadian Food Inspection Agency, after investigating cases of diarrhea caused by mislabeled fish, decided not to ban escolar or oilfish, but instead issued a fact sheet noting the potential adverse effects of consumption and recommending consumers speak with their retailer, verify fish species and consume the fish in small portion sizes using preparation methods that reduce oil content. 

Hawaiian State Representative James Tokioka introduced HB2669, a bill aimed at banning the catch, sale or possession of escolar.  HB2669 was deferred on February 1, 2010.

References

Gempylidae
Fish described in 1843